The 1977–78 Copa del Rey was the 76th staging of the Spanish Cup. The competition began on 14 September 1977 and concluded on 19 April 1978 with the final.

First round

|}
Bye: Valladolid Promesas.

Second round

|}

Bye: Getafe

Third round

|}

Fourth round

|}

Bye: Real Madrid and Real Sociedad.

Round of 16

|}

Quarter-finals

|}

Semi-finals

|}

Final

|}

References

External links
 rsssf.com
 linguasport.com

Copa del Rey seasons
Copa del Rey
Copa